The Spry Framework is an open source Ajax framework developed by Adobe Systems which is used in the construction of  Rich Internet applications. Unlike other pure JavaScript frameworks such as the Dojo Toolkit and Prototype, Spry is geared towards web designers, not web developers. On August 29, 2012, Adobe announced that it would no longer continue development of Spry and handed it over to the community on GitHub.

Components 
The Spry framework broadly consists of
 Spry Effects - animation effects like blind, fade, grow, highlight, shake, slide and squish.
 Spry Data - data binding to HTML markup using minimal code or proprietary markup. Spry uses Google's Xpath JavaScript library to convert XML into JavaScript objects. It can handle XML, HTML and JSON data.
 Spry Widgets - framework for development of widgets, and included widgets such as the accordion.

Versions 
Spry is currently in beta. The current version is 1.6.1. Spry prerelease 1.5 was released on May 17, 2007

On August 29, 2012, Adobe announced that they would discontinue investing in Spry, focusing on jQuery instead.

Usage 
The Spry framework is directly integrated into Adobe Systems's Dreamweaver CS3.

There is further speculation as to how Adobe will utilize the Spry codebase. Possible uses are:
 Ajax development within an IDE such as Eclipse (software).
 Ajax generation from server code using ColdFusion. Ruby on Rails offers similar functionality.
 Ajax application generation from Adobe Flex code. OpenLaszlo will offer similar functionality with their "Legals" release (version 4).

Competitors 
Spry competes with a number of other Ajax frameworks and toolkits:
 Atlas Framework from Microsoft
 Ext JS
 Dojo Toolkit
 Echo
 Google Web Toolkit
 jQuery
 MooTools
 M and Script.aculo.us
 YUI Library

See also 

 Ajax framework

References

External links 
 GitHub page

Adobe Inc.
JavaScript libraries